Maria da Graça may refer to:

Places
Maria da Graça, Rio de Janeiro, a neighborhood of Rio de Janeiro, Brazil
Maria da Graça Station, a stop on the Rio de Janeiro Metro

People
Maria da Graça Meneghel (born 1963), Brazilian entertainer Xuxa
Maria da Graça (1919–1995), Portuguese actress, see O Pátio das Cantigas